Philip Charles Winchester (born March 24, 1981) is an American actor. He is known for his roles in The Patriot, The Hi-Line, LD 50 Lethal Dose, Thunderbirds, CSI: Miami, King Lear, Strike Back, Flyboys, In My Sleep, The Heart of the Earth and Shaking Dream Land. He is also known for his role as Peter Stone in Chicago Justice and Law & Order: Special Victims Unit.

Early life and education
Winchester was born on March 24, 1981 in Belgrade, Montana. He graduated from Belgrade High School in 1999. He then lived and worked in London, England (his mother's home country), and attended the London Academy of Music and Dramatic Art (LAMDA).

Career
Winchester's acting career started with a small role in the 1998 film The Patriot, which was filmed in and around the towns of Bozeman and Ennis, Montana. After graduating from high school, he began to take roles in plays, including that of Edmund in King Lear opposite Ian McKellen, in the 2007 Royal Shakespeare Company production.

In 2003, he starred in the independent film The Telephone, which was filmed in Bristol and produced by Robert Finlay. In 2008, he was cast as Robinson Crusoe in the NBC action TV series Crusoe. In 2009, he was cast in Maneater, a two-part Lifetime miniseries starring Sarah Chalke.

Winchester has also appeared in the films Solomon Kane (2009) (as a former member of the title character's crew, turned freedom-fighter) and In My Sleep (2010) (as the lead), and the Syfy TV mini-series Alice.

From 2010, he has played the role of Frank Stanton, parallel universe fiance of Olivia Dunham, in the Fox TV series Fringe. From 2011, he has appeared as Leontes in the Starz series Camelot. 
Other credits include the second, third, fourth and fifth seasons of Strike Back. The series follows the adventures of two Section 20 agents, Sgt. Michael Stonebridge (Winchester) and American former Delta Force officer Damien Scott (Sullivan Stapleton).  He also starred with Wesley Snipes and Charity Wakefield in the NBC drama The Player in 2015. He also starred in Chicago Justice as lead prosecutor Peter Stone. This character then became the Assistant District Attorney (ADA) on Law & Order: Special Victims Unit during season 19 after the previous ADA Rafael Barba (Raúl Esparza) resigned. In March 2019, Winchester announced that he would be leaving SVU ahead of its twenty-first season, making season twenty his last on the show.

Filmography

Film

Television

References

External links
 

1981 births
Living people
20th-century American male actors
21st-century American male actors
Alumni of the London Academy of Music and Dramatic Art
American expatriate male actors in the United Kingdom
American male film actors
American male Shakespearean actors
American male stage actors
American male television actors
American people of English descent
Male actors from Montana
People from Belgrade, Montana
People from Gallatin County, Montana